Jorge Manuel Rebelo Fernandes (born 1 September 1976), known as Silas, is a Portuguese former footballer who played as a midfielder, currently a manager.

He amassed Primeira Liga totals of 236 matches and 30 goals over nine seasons, representing in the competition União de Leiria, Marítimo and Belenenses. He also played professionally in four other countries, mainly Spain and Cyprus.

Playing career

Early years and Leiria
Silas was born in Lisbon. He spent two years of his childhood in the academy of Sporting CP, where he received his nickname for his resemblance to Brazilian first-team player Paulo Silas. Following his release, he chose Atlético Clube de Portugal due to its proximity to his grandmother's house in Campolide. After three years there as a professional from 1995 he emigrated to Spain, representing lowly AD Ceuta who also loaned him for one season to Elche CF in Segunda División. During his time in the North African exclave, he was struck by a concrete block when walking past a construction site, and required 11 stitches in his head. 

Silas first made his name at U.D. Leiria, with whom he achieved a couple of top six Primeira Liga finishes, also making the Taça de Portugal final in 2003. During the 2001–02 campaign he was managed by up-and-coming José Mourinho and, the following year, made his first appearance for the Portugal national team, in a 1–0 friendly win over Macedonia on 3 April 2003; he later played against Paraguay and Bolivia.

Wolverhampton and Belenenses
Silas signed for newly promoted Premier League club Wolverhampton Wanderers in July 2003, for an initial fee of £1 million. However, he endured a frustrating time in England, failing to settle in the country and establish himself in the squad; during their doomed season he made a mere nine league appearances, totalling 14 overall.

In the summer of 2004, Silas returned to his homeland and joined top division side C.S. Marítimo on a season-long loan. The following campaign, still not featuring in the Wolves manager's plans (now Glenn Hoddle) he was loaned out to another team in the country and tier, this time C.F. Os Belenenses.

At the end of the season, having made 28 appearances with four goals, Silas decided to make his move permanent, joining on a free transfer as his contract at Wolverhampton had expired. He continued to be an undisputed starter from 2006 to 2009, after which he was released and returned to Leiria, recently returned to the main division.

Later career
From 2011 to 2014, Silas competed in the Cypriot First Division, representing AEL Limassol, AEP Paphos FC and Ethnikos Achna FC. In July 2014, after a 16-year absence, he returned to Atlético, now in the Segunda Liga. In April of the following year he, alongside teammate Dady, was involved in a match-fixing allegation whereby it was alleged that both had approached S.C. Farense players with a bribe to facilitate Atlético's win, but nothing was ever proven. The season initially ended in relegation, but the team eventually was spared at the expense of S.C. Beira-Mar who dropped down a division due to irregularities.

On 8 July 2015, shortly before his 39th birthday, Silas signed a six-month deal with Indian Super League club NorthEast United FC. He made his debut on 6 October, playing the full 90 minutes in 1–3 loss at Kerala Blasters FC. On 11 November, a minute after coming on as a substitute for his compatriot Simão, he scored his first goal for the Guwahati-based team, the decisive one in a 2–1 victory away to Chennaiyin FC.

Silas returned to his homeland on 12 February 2016, joining C.D. Cova da Piedade. He helped them to the third division title and a first promotion to the professional leagues, scoring the winning penalty in the final shootout against F.C. Vizela on 5 June 2016.

Coaching career
Silas retired at the end of the season, at the age of 40. His first coaching experience was as manager of the Portuguese footballers' union in 2017.

On 16 January 2018, Silas replaced Domingos Paciência at former club Belenenses. His first game in charge occurred four days later, and he led his team to a 0–0 away draw against Marítimo. In December 2018 he was named "Manager of the Month", and he achieved final positions of 12th and ninth in his first two years, being dismissed from his position at the reorganised Belenenses SAD on 4 September 2019 when the team had not scored in their first four games of the campaign. 

Late in the same month, Silas succeeded Leonel Pontes at the helm of Sporting on a contract running until June 2020. On 4 March 2020, he was relieved of his duties and replaced by S.C. Braga's Rúben Amorim, who became Sporting's fourth coach of the season.

Silas completed his UEFA Pro Licence course on 14 November 2020. The following 1 February, he took over from the dismissed João Pedro Sousa at F.C. Famalicão on a one-and-a-half-year deal. He left on 8 March, after his one win in six games left them second from bottom.

Silas was appointed head coach of AEL Limassol on 12 May 2022, being fired in September.

Managerial statistics

Honours
AEL Limassol
Cypriot First Division: 2011–12

Cova da Piedade
Campeonato de Portugal: 2015–16

References

External links

1976 births
Living people
Portuguese footballers
Footballers from Lisbon
Association football midfielders
Primeira Liga players
Liga Portugal 2 players
Segunda Divisão players
Atlético Clube de Portugal players
U.D. Leiria players
C.S. Marítimo players
C.F. Os Belenenses players
C.D. Cova da Piedade players
Segunda División players
Segunda División B players
AD Ceuta footballers
Elche CF players
Premier League players
Wolverhampton Wanderers F.C. players
Cypriot First Division players
AEL Limassol players
AEP Paphos FC players
Ethnikos Achna FC players
Indian Super League players
NorthEast United FC players
Portugal international footballers
Portuguese expatriate footballers
Expatriate footballers in Spain
Expatriate footballers in England
Expatriate footballers in Cyprus
Expatriate footballers in India
Portuguese expatriate sportspeople in Spain
Portuguese expatriate sportspeople in England
Portuguese expatriate sportspeople in Cyprus
Portuguese expatriate sportspeople in India
Portuguese football managers
Primeira Liga managers
C.F. Os Belenenses managers
Belenenses SAD managers
Sporting CP managers
F.C. Famalicão managers
Cypriot First Division managers
AEL Limassol managers
Portuguese expatriate football managers
Expatriate football managers in Cyprus